Nawanagar may refer to:
Nawanagar, Bihar, a village in Buxur district, Bihar, India
 Nawanagar State, a former princely state in Gujarat, India
Jamnagar, city in Gujarat, India, known as Nawanagar in 1920s

See also
 Navanagar, a planned new city in Karnataka, India